Comencho Lake is a body of water in the Broadback River watershed in the Eeyou Istchee James Bay (municipality) area within the Nord-du-Québec, in the province of Quebec, in Canada. This lake is part of the territory of the Assinica Wildlife Sanctuary.

Forestry is the main economic activity of the sector. Recreational tourism activities come second.

The surface of Comencho Lake is usually frozen from early November to mid-May, however, safe ice circulation is generally from mid-November to mid-April.

Geography

Toponymy
Presumably of Cree origin, the origin and significance of this hydronym remain uncertain. Nevertheless, the graph of the current hydronym is a modification of Comenscocho and Comenscacho; the first dating back at least to 1931, being indicated on a plan of survey. From 1939, the Comencho form is used on map documents. The nearby Lake Assinica has already been designated Comenscamoca. These toponyms and their variant have in common the root men or min meaning "blueberries". The name Caminscanane Lake, denoting a lake to the west of the previous ones, has been translated as "where there are many blueberries".

The toponym "lake Comencho" was officialized on December 5, 1968, by the Commission de toponymie du Québec, when it was created.

Notes and references

See also 

Eeyou Istchee James Bay
Lakes of Nord-du-Québec
LComencho